Sun Jun (born 16 June 1975) is a former world number 1 singles badminton player from China in the late 1990s whose resume includes the World Championship, World Cup, Asian Championship and All England men's singles titles. He was known for his all-round defensive ability as well as his never-say-die attitude on court as exemplified by his famous match with Peter Rasmussen whereby he suffered a severe leg cramp during mid-match but basically carried on to finish an entire set limping on one leg, at one point leading by 10-3 due to intelligent play before succumbing to his opponent.

He is married to the great doubles badminton player Ge Fei.

Career

World Championships
Sun won the 1999 IBF World Championships, beating Fung Permadi in the final. He also won a silver medal at the 1997 IBF World Championships, when in the final he was leading 10-3 in the deciding set against Peter Rasmussen despite suffering from a leg cramp, eventually losing 16-17, 18-13, 15-10.

Summer Olympics
Sun Jun competed in badminton at the 1996 Summer Olympics in men's singles. In the first round he had a bye, and in the second one he defeated Kim Hak-kyun from Korea. In round of 16 he was beaten by Alan Budikusuma 15-5, 15-6.

Sun Jun competed in badminton at the 2000 Summer Olympics in men's singles. In the first round he had a bye, and in the second round he defeated the defending Olympic champion Poul-Erik Høyer Larsen from Denmark. In the round of 16 Sun beat Richard Vaughan from Great Britain and in quarterfinals he lost to Hendrawan from Indonesia.

Achievements

World Championships 
Men's singles

World Cup 
Men's singles

Asian Games 
Men's singles

Asian Championships 
Men's singles

Mixed doubles

Asian Cup 
Men's singles

World Junior Championships 
Boys' singles

IBF World Grand Prix 
The World Badminton Grand Prix sanctioned by International Badminton Federation (IBF) from 1983 to 2006.

Men's singles

IBF International 
Men's singles

Men's doubles

Mixed doubles

References

External links
 

1975 births
Living people
Sportspeople from Nanjing
Badminton players from Jiangsu
Chinese male badminton players
Badminton players at the 1996 Summer Olympics
Badminton players at the 2000 Summer Olympics
Olympic badminton players of China
Badminton players at the 1998 Asian Games
Asian Games silver medalists for China
Asian Games bronze medalists for China
Asian Games medalists in badminton
Medalists at the 1998 Asian Games
World No. 1 badminton players